Helen Steiner Rice (May 19, 1900 – April 23, 1981) was an American writer of both inspirational and Christian poetry.

Biography
Helen Steiner was born in Lorain, Ohio on May 19, 1900. Her father, a railroad worker, died in the influenza epidemic of 1918. She began work for a public utility and progressed to the position of advertising manager, which was rare for a woman at that time.  She also became the Ohio State Chairman of the Women's Public Information Committee of the Electric Light Association, and campaigned for women's rights and improved working conditions.

In 1929, she married Franklin Dryden Rice, a bank vice-president in Dayton, Ohio. After the stock market crash in October that year, Franklin lost his job and his investments. He fell into a depression from which he never recovered and committed suicide in 1932.

Rice became a successful businesswoman and lecturer but found her most satisfying outlet in writing verse for the greeting card company Gibson Greetings. Her poems received wide exposure in the 1960s when several were read by Aladdin on the poetry segment of the Lawrence Welk television show.

The demand for her poems became so great that her books are still selling steadily after many printings, and she has been acclaimed as "America's beloved inspirational poet laureate". Helen Steiner Rice’s books of inspirational poetry have now sold nearly seven million copies. Her strong religious faith and the ability she had to express deep emotion gave her poems timeless appeal.

She died on the evening of April 23, 1981, a month before her 81st birthday, and was buried in Elmwood Cemetery in Lorain, Ohio.

Pope John Paul II, President Jimmy Carter and his wife Rosalynn were admirers of her artistry.

Bibliography
This is a list of books by Helen Steiner Rice published during her lifetime.  Many other volumes of her works have been published after her death.

 A time for rejoicing. Cincinnati: Gibson Greeting Cards, 1964.
 A Christmas gift of love. Cincinnati: Gibson Greeting Cards, 1964.
 Mother is a Word Called Love. Cincinnati: Gibson Greeting Cards, 1964.
 Climb 'til your dream comes true. Cincinnati: Gibson Greeting Cards, 1964.
 Tidings of joy for your Christmas. Cincinnati: Gibson Greeting Cards, 1965.
 Let not your heart be troubled. Old Tappan, N.J., Fleming H. Revell, 1965.
 On life's busy thoroughfare. Cincinnati: Gibson Greeting Cards, 1966.
 Just for you: a collection of inspirational verses.  Garden City, N.Y., Doubleday, 1967.
 Prayers and meditations for your Christmas. Cincinnati: Gibson Greeting Cards, 1967.
 A gift of love; poems from the heart of Helen Steiner Rice. Old Tappan, N.J.: Fleming H. Revell, 1968.
 Heart Gifts from Helen Steiner Rice; A Special Selection of Her Poems and a Pen Portrait of Her As a Person. Old Tappan, N.J.: Fleming H. Revell, 1968.
 Sunshine of joy. Old Tappan, N.J.: Fleming H. Revell, 1968.
 Lovingly: poems for all seasons. Old Tappan, N.J.: Fleming H. Revell, 1970.
 If there had never been a Christmas.  Cincinnati: Gibson Greeting Cards, 1971.
 Prayerfully. Old Tappan, N.J., Fleming H. Revell, 1971.
 Yesterday, today, and tomorrow. Cincinnati: Gibson Greeting Cards, 1971.
 Someone cares; the collected poems of Helen Steiner Rice.  Old Tappan, N.J., Fleming H. Revell, 1972.
 Story of the Christmas guest, as retold by Helen Steiner Rice. Old Tappan, N.J., Fleming H. Revell, 1972.
 Life is forever. Old Tappan, N.J., Fleming H. Revell, 1974.
 Somebody loves you. Old Tappan, N.J., Fleming H. Revell, 1976.
 Everyone needs someone : poems of love and friendship. Old Tappan, N.J., Fleming H. Revell, 1978.
 In the vineyard of the Lord / Helen Steiner Rice, as told to Fred Bauer. Old Tappan, N.J., Fleming H. Revell, 1979.
 And the greatest of these is love : poems and promises / Helen Steiner Rice ; compiled by Donald T. Kauffman. Old Tappan, N.J., Fleming H. Revell, 1980.
 Mothers are a gift of love. Old Tappan, N.J., Fleming H. Revell, 1980.
 Gifts from the heart. Old Tappan, N.J., Fleming H. Revell, 1981.

References

Further reading
Ronald Pollitt and Virginia Wiltse, Helen Steiner Rice: Ambassador of Sunshine, Hodder & Stoughton 1995,

External links
Biography at official website, helensteinerrice.com

1900 births
1981 deaths
People from Lorain, Ohio
20th-century American poets
Christian poets
American women poets
Poets from Ohio
20th-century American women writers